Rositsa may refer to:

 Rositsa (Belarus), a village in the Vitebsk Region (Belarus)

Bulgaria
 Rositsa (river), a Bulgarian river
 Rositsa, Dobrich Province
 Rositsa, Targovishte Province
 Rositsa, Veliko Tarnovo Province

Given name
 Rositsa Dimitrova (born 1955), Bulgarian former volleyball player 
 Rositsa Pekhlivanova (born 1955), Bulgarian middle-distance runner
 Rositsa Stamenova (born 1955), Bulgarian sprinter
 Rositsa Velkova-Zheleva (born 1972), Bulgarian politician and economist
 Rositsa Yanakieva (1954–2015), Bulgarian politician and chemist